Bottacks (Na Botagan in Scottish Gaelic) is a small scattered township, located 1.5 miles north north east of Strathpeffer, in Ross-shire, Scottish Highlands and is in the Scottish council area of Highland.

The village of Fodderty lies 1 mile to the east.

References
 http://www.oldscottish.com/fodderty.html - 1843 census that lists a (single) head of household in Bottacks

Populated places in Ross and Cromarty